The Standing Joint Committee on the Scrutiny of Regulations (REGS) is a joint committee of the House of Commons of Canada and the Senate of Canada. Its mandate is to examine regulations made by the government of Canada for flaws in legality and execution.

Studies
Matters of legality and the procedural aspects of government regulations
The appropriate principles and practices to be observed in creating and using executive regulations and statutes
Scrutinising the drafting of powers enabling delegates of Parliament to make subordinate laws

Membership

Senate

House of Commons

External links
 

Reg